The 2001 European Wrestling Championships were held in the Greco-Romane in Istanbul and  the men's Freestyle style, and the women's freestyle in Budapest.

Medal table

Medal summary

Men's freestyle

Men's Greco-Roman

Women's freestyle

References

External links
Fila's official championship website

Europe
W
W
European Wrestling Championships
Euro
Euro
Sports competitions in Istanbul
Sports competitions in Budapest
2001 in European sport